Otrozhny is an urban locality (an urban-type settlement) in Anadyrsky District of Chukotka Autonomous Okrug, Russia, located about  west of Anadyr. It is a former gold mining settlement.

History
The settlement was established in 1964 following the discovery of gold in the area. As well as gold, the mine also extracted osmiridium, with reports stating that several hundred grams were extracted in 1977, a very rare metal, normally only found in conjunction with other platinum group metals. The settlement was abandoned in 1998 when the extraction of gold was no longer economically viable and as of 2008 is in the process of being officially liquidated.

The mines were declared unprofitable and that there was no possibility of developing any other form of economy in 1999 and the settlement was closed along with a number of others in Chukotka. The Russian government guaranteed funds to transport non-working pensioners and the unemployed in liquidated settlements including Otrozhny from Chukotka to other parts of Russia. The Ministry of railways was obliged to lease containers for the transportation of the migrants' goods to the Chukotkan administration and ensure that they were delivered to the various settlements.

Climate
Otrozhny has a Continental Subarctic or Boreal (taiga) climates (Dfc). On average, the temperature is below freezing from the start of September through to the end of the following May, with average low temperatures of below minus twenty Celsius occurring between November and April. June, July and August are the only months where the temperature is above freezing on average. This short summer period is still cool however, with temperatures rarely rising above ten degrees, although, as can be seen in the table below, there are occasional instances of significant heat.

See also
List of inhabited localities in Anadyrsky District

References

Notes

Sources

External links
Otrozhny photo gallery
More photos of Otrozhny

Ghost towns in Chukotka Autonomous Okrug
Urban-type settlements in Chukotka Autonomous Okrug
Populated places established in 1964
1964 establishments in the Soviet Union